, real name , is a columnist and editor born on January 1, 1960, in Mie Prefecture, Japan. He is credited as popularizing the term "otaku" in its modern colloquial usage. After dropping out of Meiji University's Nakano Junior and Senior High Schools, he graduated from Wako University. Along with Yūichi Endō, he launched the Tokyo Otona Club in 1982.

He is most well known for his study of serial killer Tsutomu Miyazaki, published in 1989.

References

1960 births
Living people
Otaku
Writers from Mie Prefecture
Print editors
Japanese essayists
Japanese editors

Japanese columnists
Japanese male writers
Wako University alumni